Conalia helva is a beetle in the genus Conalia of the family Mordellidae. It was described in 1862 by John Lawrence LeConte.

References

Mordellidae
Beetles described in 1862